Dirty Harry is a 1990 video game based on the Dirty Harry film franchise starring Clint Eastwood. It was developed by Canadian studio Gray Matter and released exclusively for the Nintendo Entertainment System (NES).

Story 
Harry Callahan is a San Francisco police detective who rarely follows police protocol. A powerful drug lord known as The Anaconda has created a burgeoning drug-smuggling operation by recruiting all of San Francisco's drug gangs. Harry must crack the case and take down the kingpin himself on Alcatraz.

Gameplay 
The game is a side-scroller in which players must guide Dirty Harry throughout San Francisco. He wears a blue suit, although it can be exchanged for a white suit. He wields his signature Smith & Wesson Model 29, and players have the ability to draw the weapon without actually firing it. The Smith & Wesson Model 29 also exhibits a recoil effect when fired. Other weapons consist of LAWs rockets, harpoon guns, and explosive remote-controlled cars. When injured, Harry's health can be restored by eating hot dogs.

The game has a room where if Harry enters it, he will be unable to leave it, as the exit is replaced with the words, "Ha, ha, ha".  The only way to escape the room is to reset.

Music 
The music in Dirty Harry was composed by Steven Samler and Elliot Delman. The music was composed using Digital Performer for the Macintosh. Not only were the composers given credit in the game and the instruction manual, but also the back of the game's box, the only NES game to do so.

Film references 
The game incorporates several references to the film series. The game uses digitized speech to deliver both of Harry's famous lines: "Go ahead, make my day" and "Do I feel lucky? Well, do ya, punk?". The password for infinite lives (CLYDE) is a reference to Clyde the Orangutan from Every Which Way but Loose, the password for level two is MISTY (a reference to Play Misty for Me), both non-Dirty Harry films starring Clint Eastwood, and the password for level three is BIRD (the title of the Charlie Parker biopic Eastwood directed without any relation to Dirty Harry). A password coded into the game that does not trigger any change in gameplay, "GUNNY", refers to Eastwood's character in Heartbreak Ridge – again, a non-Dirty Harry film.

See also 
Dirty Harry (canceled video game)

References 

1990 video games
Dirty Harry video games
Video games about the illegal drug trade
Nintendo Entertainment System games
Nintendo Entertainment System-only games
North America-exclusive video games
Organized crime video games
Video games about police officers
Video games based on films
Video games set in San Francisco
Detective video games
Video games developed in Canada
Mindscape games